Gama Tower (formerly known as Cemindo Tower) is a skyscraper located at Jalan H.R. Rasuna Said, South Jakarta, Indonesia. It was also known as Rasuna Tower and Cemindo Tower during construction period, but finally named as Gama Tower. As of 2022, it is the 3rd tallest building in Jakarta, as well as Indonesia.

It has 64 floors above and 4 floors below the ground. The land area of the tower development is 1.6 hectares. It has a parking lot for over 1,100 vehicles. At present, the tower is the 3rd tallest building in Indonesia and 74th tallest building in the world. The tower is a mixed office and hotel building.

Construction of the tower was started in 2011. The tower was topped off in 2015 and opened in August 2016. At that time, the construction cost of the building was around Rp2 trillion (about US$150 million in 2016).

Gama Tower is a luxury office tower which applies green building concepts and development. Westin Hotel occupies the top 20 floors of the tower, between the 50th and 69th floors. 360 degree views of Jakarta can be observed from the restaurant at the 51st floor. Henshin operates a club and lounge at the 67th floor as well as restaurant at 68th and 69th floor, the topmost floor of the tower. A function hall is also located within the 69th floor. The rest of the floors are executive office spaces.

See also

 List of tallest buildings in Jakarta
 List of tallest buildings in Indonesia
 List of tallest buildings in Southeast Asia

References

External links
Gama Tower

Towers in Indonesia
Buildings and structures in Jakarta
Skyscrapers in Jakarta
Post-independence architecture of Indonesia
Skyscraper office buildings in Indonesia
Skyscraper hotels
Buildings and structures completed in 2015